= Game system =

- Role-playing game system
- Video game system, another name for video game console
